Donald Barr (August 8, 1921 – February 5, 2004) was an American educator, writer, and Office of Strategic Services (OSS) officer. He was an administrator at Columbia University before serving as headmaster at the Dalton School in New York City and the Hackley School in Tarrytown, New York. He also wrote two science fiction novels. His sons are former United States Attorney General William Barr and physicist Stephen Barr.

Early life and education 
Barr was born in Manhattan, New York, the son of Estelle (née DeYoung), a psychologist, and Pelham Barr, an economist. He and his wife, Mary Margaret (née Ahern), had four children including William P. Barr (who served as the 77th U.S. Attorney General in the George H. W. Bush Administration and as the 85th U.S. Attorney General in the Donald Trump Administration) and particle physicist Stephen Barr.

He was born to a Jewish family, but later converted to Catholicism. He sent his children to a Catholic elementary school and his son William would later describe him as "more Catholic than the Catholics."

Barr graduated from Columbia College in 1941 with a degree in mathematics and anthropology.

Career 
Barr served in the Office of Strategic Services (OSS) during World War II. Following the conflict, he returned to Columbia, where he earned an M.A. in English in 1950 and completed course requirements for a Ph.D. in the discipline while also teaching in the English department. During this period, he also taught "courses with field work in sociology and political science at the School of Engineering" and wrote "science and mathematics texts for elementary and junior high school students." He initiated the Columbia University Science Honors Program in 1958 and was its director (as an assistant dean at the School of Engineering) until 1964. From 1963 to 1964, he also administered the National Science Foundation Cooperative College-School Program.

He was headmaster of the Dalton School from 1964 to 1974. During his time as Dalton's headmaster, Barr is alleged to have had a role in hiring future financier and convicted sex offender Jeffrey Epstein as a math teacher despite the fact that Epstein (who graduated from high school at the age of 16 and secured a full scholarship to Cooper Union) had failed to complete his degree and was only 21 years old at the time. In 1973, Barr published Space Relations, a science fiction novel about a planet ruled by oligarchs who engage in child sex slavery. It has been noted that the plot of the novel anticipates the crimes of Epstein and his alleged accomplice, Ghislaine Maxwell.

Barr also reviewed books for The New York Times. In addition to his two science fiction novels, he sold two stories to The Magazine of Fantasy and Science Fiction; one of these (the 2002 "Sam") was reprinted in the 2003 anthology Year's Best Fantasy 3.

In 1983 President Ronald Reagan nominated Donald Barr to be a member of the National Council on Educational Research.

Selected works 
The How and Why Wonder Book of Atomic Energy (1961)
Who Pushed Humpty Dumpty? Dilemmas in American Education (1971)
Space Relations: A Slightly Gothic Interplanetary Tale (1973)
A Planet in Arms (1981)

References

External links
 Space Relations 1973 sci-fi novel at Google Books

 
 

1921 births
2004 deaths
20th-century American novelists
20th-century American male writers
21st-century American short story writers
20th-century American educators
American male novelists
American male short story writers
American people of Jewish descent
American science fiction writers
Columbia University faculty
Columbia Graduate School of Arts and Sciences alumni
Columbia College (New York) alumni 
People of the Office of Strategic Services
The New Yorker critics
Novelists from New York (state)
Converts to Roman Catholicism from Judaism
Writers from Manhattan
21st-century American male writers